Taj Building is a historic building located on the main Grand Trunk Road in Nowshera, Khyber Pakhtunkhwa, Pakistan. Formerly, it housed two film theaters where Pashto films used to premiere.

History
It was built in the 1920s and was funded by Khan Bahadur Taj Muhammad Khan. The building was made using Oriental, Roman, Gothic and Islamic architectural designs.

References 

Nowshera District
Buildings and structures in Khyber Pakhtunkhwa
1920s establishments in British India
Cinemas and movie theatres in Pakistan